Komediant means comedian in several Germanic languages, including German and Yiddish. 

Komediant may also refer to:

Komediant (film): a 1984 Czech movie directed by Otakar Vávra
The Komediant (show): a Yiddish theater act produced by Pesach Burstein and his troupe
The Komediant (documentary): a 2000 Israeli documentary in Yiddish and English directed by Arnon Goldfinger on the life and careers of Pesach Burstein and his family